Ferenc Merkli (born November 29, 1974) is a Hungarian Slovene Catholic priest, writer, and translator.

He was born in Szentgotthárd to Ferenc and Irén Merkli, and grew up in Szakonyfalu. He attended the Pontifical Gregorian University in Rome. After his ordination, he served the Deanery of Szentgotthárd in the parish of Felsőszölnök and Apátistvánfalva, and was known for celebrating bilingual masses in Hungarian and Prekmurje Slovene.

In 2011, Merkli translated the work of Lojzer Kozar into Hungarian, and compiled a hymnal with content in the Prekmurje dialect and standard Slovene for the Hungarian Slovenes with Lojzer Kozar Jr. (Cirill Kozar).

Merkli lives in Vasszécseny.

See also 
 Church of St. Stephen Harding in Apátistvánfalva
 List of Slovene writers and poets in Hungary

Sources 
 Lojze Kozar: Elmozdítható gyertyatartó, Martinus Kiadó Szombathely 2011. 
 Poslušajte vsi ljudje, Gornji Senik 2011. 

Slovenian writers and poets in Hungary
21st-century Slovenian Roman Catholic priests
21st-century Hungarian Roman Catholic priests
Hungarian translators
Hungarian Slovenes
1974 births
Living people
People from Vas County